Francis Xavier Maher Jr. (May 8, 1918 – April 11, 1992) was a professional American football player who played running back for one season in the National Football League (NFL) with the Cleveland Rams and Pittsburgh Steelers. Prior, he served in World War II for the United States Army.

References

External links
 

1918 births
1992 deaths
American football running backs
Cleveland Rams players
Pittsburgh Steelers players
Toledo Rockets football players
Players of American football from Detroit
United States Army personnel of World War II